Morozenko is a Ukrainian surname. It may refer to:

 Morozenko, pen name of Sydir Vorobkevych (1836–1903), Ukrainian composer and writer
 Pavel Morozenko (1939–1991), Soviet-Ukrainian actor
 Yevhen Morozenko (born 1991), Ukrainian footballer

See also
 

Ukrainian-language surnames